Hafeez , meaning "protector" in Arabic ( حفیظ ) is a Muslim name given to boy, it may refer to:

Given name
 Hafeez Jullundhri, Pakistani poet
 Hafeez Malik, Professor of Political Science at Villanova University, in Pennsylvania

Surname
 Azeem Hafeez, Pakistani cricketer
 Mohammad Hafeez, Pakistani cricketer
 Muin Bek Hafeez, Indian basketball player
 Osman Abdel Hafeez, Egyptian Olympic fencer

See also
 Hafiz

Arabic masculine given names
Arabic-language surnames

hi:हफ़ीज़